Katherine A. Mirica is an American chemist who is an Associate Professor at Dartmouth College. Her research considers materials chemistry, with a particular focus on environmental science and microelectronics.

Early life and education 
Mirica was born in Eastern Ukraine. She moved to Rhode Island whilst at high school. Mirica was an undergraduate at Boston College, where she majored in chemistry and worked alongside Prof. Lawrence T. Scott. She was awarded the Matthew Copithorne Scholarship and the Scholar of the College Award. After graduating with her B.S. in Chemistry in 2004, Mirica moved to Harvard University for her graduate studies, where she worked with Prof. George M. Whitesides to investigate three-dimensional self-assembly using magnetic levitation. Together they worked on paper-based diagnostics and protein biophysics. After earning her doctorate, Mirica joined the laboratory of Timothy M. Swager at Massachusetts Institute of Technology as an National Institutes of Health Research Fellow. Her work at MIT considered solvent-free portable electronic carbon-based chemical sensors.

Research and career 
Mirica was appointed to the faculty at Dartmouth College in 2015. She studies self-assembly and multifunctional framework materials. Amongst the materials developed by Mirica, two-dimensional conductive metal-organic frameworks hold promise for electroanalysis.

Awards and honors 

 2018 Thieme Chemistry Journals Award
 2018 Sloan Research Fellowship
 2019 Cottrell Scholar Award
 2020 Camille Dreyfus Teacher-Scholar Award
 2020 National Science Foundation CAREER Award
 2020 NIH Maximizing Investigators' Research Award
 2021 Karen E. Wetterhahn Memorial Award for Distinguished Creative or Scholarly Achievement
 2022 Wetterhahn Science Symposium Keynote Speaker

Selected publications

References 

Dartmouth College faculty
Harvard University alumni
Morrissey College of Arts & Sciences alumni
American chemists
American people of Ukrainian descent
Living people
Year of birth missing (living people)
American women chemists
21st-century American women